Andry Nirina Rajoelina (born 30 May 1974) is a Malagasy politician and businessman who has been the President of Madagascar since 2019. He was previously president of a provisional government from 2009 to 2014 following a political crisis and military-backed coup, having held the office of Mayor of Antananarivo for one year prior. Before entering the political arena, Rajoelina was involved in the private sector, including a printing and advertising company called Injet in 1999 and the Viva radio and television networks in 2007. 

He formed political party Young Malagasies Determined and was elected Mayor of Antananarivo in 2007. While in this position, he led an opposition movement against then-President Marc Ravalomanana that culminated in a 2009 political crisis. Rajoelina was appointed as President of the High Transitional Authority of Madagascar (HTA) by a military council, in a move characterised as a coup d'état by the international community. Rajoelina dissolved the Senate and National Assembly, and transferred their powers to a variety of new governance structures responsible for overseeing the transition toward a new constitutional authority. This conflicted with an internationally mediated process to establish a transitional government. Voters approved a new constitution in a controversial national referendum in November 2010, ushering in the Fourth Republic.

He held the Presidency of the HTA until general elections were held in 2013, and stepped down in 2014. He won the 2018 presidential election and was inaugurated President of Madagascar on 19 January 2019. His tenure has included directing the government's response to the COVID-19 pandemic in Madagascar, during which he promoted misinformation and unproven treatments for the disease, as well as a 2021 food insecurity crisis and Cyclone Batsirai.

Family and early years 

Andry Rajoelina was born on 30 May 1974 to a relatively wealthy family in Antsirabe. His father, now-retired Colonel Roger Yves Rajoelina, held dual nationality and fought for the French army in the Algerian War. Although his family could afford a college education for their son, Andry Rajoelina opted to discontinue his studies after completing his baccalauréat to launch a career as an entrepreneur.

In 1994, Rajoelina met his future spouse Mialy Razakandisa, who was then completing her senior year at a high school in Antananarivo. The couple courted long-distance for six years while Mialy completed her undergraduate and masters studies in finance and accounting in Paris; they were reunited in Madagascar in 2000 and wed the same year. Their marriage produced two boys, Arena (born 2002) and Ilonstoa (born 2003), and a daughter born in 2005 whom the couple named Ilona.

Media entrepreneur 

In 1993, at the age of 19, Rajoelina established his first enterprise: a small event production company called Show Business. In the following year, he organized an annual concert called Live that brought together foreign and Malagasy musical artists. The event gathered 50,000 participants on its tenth anniversary.

In 1999, he launched Injet, the first digital printing technology company available on the island, which gained quick traction with its expansion of billboard advertising throughout the capital. Following his marriage in 2000, Andry and Mialy Rajoelina acquired Domapub, a competing Antananarivo-based billboard advertising business owned by Andry's in-laws. The couple worked together to manage the family businesses, with Andry responsible for Injet and his wife handling the affairs of Domapub.

In May 2007, Andry Rajoelina purchased the Ravinala television and radio stations, and renamed them Viva TV and Viva FM.

Mayor of Antananarivo (2007–2009)

Elections 

In 2007, Rajoelina created and led the political association Tanora malaGasy Vonona (TGV), meaning "determined Malagasy youth", and shortly afterward announced his candidacy to run for Mayor of Antananarivo. His very young age became a lever to gain a quick popularity throughout the nation ( of politics). Rajoelina was elected on 12 December 2007 with 63.3% of the vote on a 55% voter turnout, beating TIM party incumbent Hery Rafalimanana.

Opposition movement against Ravalomanana 

The first conflicts between Andry Rajoelina and president Marc Ravalomanana date back to 2003, when the government required the removal of Antananarivo's first Trivision advertising panels, which Rajoelina had installed at a major roundabout in the capital.

In November and December 2008, the government became embroiled in two scandals. A July 2008 deal with Daewoo Logistics to lease half the island's arable land for South Korean cultivation of corn and palm oil, and the November 2008 purchase of a second presidential jet, a Boeing 737, at a cost of US$60 million, which led the World Bank and the IMF to suspend $35 million worth of financial support to the Island. Rajoelina used this to garner support against Ravalomanana's government.

Upon taking office, the city's treasury had a debt of 8.2 billion Malagasy Ariary (approximately US$4.6 million). On 4 January 2008, due to unpaid debts to the Jirama, the city of Antananarivo was hit by a general water cutoff, and brownouts of the city's street lights. After an audit, it was found that the Jirama owed about the same amount of money to the City Hall, and the sanction on the city's population was retrieved.

On 13 December 2008, the government closed Andry Rajoelina's Viva TV, stating that a Viva interview with exiled former head of state Didier Ratsiraka was "likely to disturb peace and security". Within a week Rajoelina met with twenty of Madagascar's most prominent opposition leaders, referred to in the press as the "Club of 20", to develop a joint statement demanding that the Ravalomanana administration improve its adherence to democratic principles. Rajoelina also promised to dedicate a politically open public space in the capital which he would call Place de la Démocratie ("Democracy Plaza").

Beginning in January 2009, Andry Rajoelina led a series of political rallies in downtown Antananarivo. On 13 January, he launched an ultimatum to the government to restore Viva TV. A week later, the transmission failure message of Viva TV was changed to a still picture of Andry Rajoelina, which led the authorities to seize the channel's transmitter by force. On 17 January, Andry Rajoelina gathered 30,000 supporters at a public park which he renamed Place de la Démocratie to defy the public executive power of Ravalomanana. At a rally on 31 January 2009, Rajoelina announced that he was in charge of the country's affairs, declaring: "Since the president and the government have not assumed their responsibilities, I therefore proclaim that I will run all national affairs as of today." He added that a request for President Ravalomanana to formally resign would shortly be filed with the Parliament of Madagascar. This self-declaration of power discredited Rajoelina's democratic aims, and the number of attendees at subsequent rallies declined, averaging around 3,000 to 5,000 participants.

Destitution 

On 3 February, the Ministry of Domestic Affairs dismissed Rajoelina as mayor of Antananarivo and appointed a special delegation headed by Guy Randrianarisoa to manage the affairs of the capital. Andry Rajoelina contested the decision.

President of the High Transitional Authority (2009–2014)

Resignation of Ravalomanana 

On 7 February, Andry Rajoelina organized a new rally during which the leaders of the orange movement declared the constitution of a High Transitional Authority and Andry Rajoelina as its president. The crowd then marched towards the Presidential palace to state its claim to power. The presidential guards opened fire, killing 31 protesters, and wounding more than 200. This massacre dramatically diminished the Presidency's popularity in the crisis, and led to losing its support from the Army which blamed the President for ordering the shooting.

On 6 March, after the Malagasy authorities attempted to arrest him, Andry Rajoelina took refuge in the French embassy. On 10 March, the Army released a 72-hour ultimatum, urging the political leaders to find a solution to the crisis. On 15 March, Ravalomanana went on air to declare a referendum to solve the crisis, an offer refused by Rajoelina who instead called for the President's arrest. The following day, Ravalomanana dissolved the government, resigned, and transferred the Presidential seal to a senior committee of the Army. On 18 March, the Army transferred power directly to Rajoelina, making him president of the High Transitional Authority (HAT). Madagascar's constitutional court deemed the double-transfer of power (Ravalomanana-Army-Rajoelina) to be legal.

Rajoelina was sworn in as President on 21 March at Mahamasina stadium before a crowd of 40,000 supporters. He was 35 years of age when sworn in, making him the youngest president in the country's history and the youngest head of government in the world at that time.

Resolution of the political conflict 

On 19 March 2009, SADC announced it did not recognize the new government. The African Union described the events as a coup d'état and suspended Madagascar and threatened sanctions if the constitutional government had not been restored within six months. The United States, Madagascar's largest bilateral donor and provider of humanitarian aid, also refused to acknowledge the Rajoelina administration, and ordered all nonessential embassy employees to leave the Island. Madagascar was removed from the list of beneficiaries of the African Growth and Opportunity Act (AGOA). In May 2009, the IMF also froze its aid to Madagascar. The UN responded to the power transfer by freezing 600 million euros in planned aid. The international community maintained that Rajoelina's legitimacy was conditional to free and fair elections.

In August 2009, the historic Presidents of Madagascar (Rajoelina, Ravalomanana, Ratsiraka & Zafy) signed the Maputo Accords, which provided guidelines for a period of consensual political transition. In 11 October 2009, Andry Rajoelina appointed Eugene Malganza as Prime Minister. Further guidelines were defined during the Addis Ababa reunion to split the presidential power with 2 co-presidents. The Malagasy former presidents were authorized to return to the Island, and Rajoelina named a new Prime Minister. 

In November 2010, a constitutional referendum resulted in the adoption of the state's fourth constitution with 73% in favor and a voter turnout of 52.6%. One change made by the new constitution was to lower the minimum age for presidential candidates from 40 to 35, making Rajoelina eligible to eventually stand in presidential elections. The new constitution mandated the leader of the High Transitional Authority – the position held by Rajoelina – be kept as interim president until an election could take place, and required presidential candidates to have lived in Madagascar for at least six months prior to the elections, effectively barring Ravalomanana and other opposition leaders living in exile from running in the next election.

In June 2010, the EU announced the extension of its $600-million financial aid to Madagascar. In November 2011, his talk at the UN 66th Session of the United Nations General Assembly marked the first major form of international recognition of the Transition government. On 13 May 2011, Andry Rajoelina met with Alain Juppé, the French Minister of Foreign Affairs, and on 7 December 2011 he was officially received by the French President Nicolas Sarkozy.

In May 2013, when Ravalomanana's wife announced her candidacy for the 2013 elections, Rajoelina saw it as a breach of contract and reintroduced his own candidacy for the elections. This situation led to the elections to be postponed many times. A special electoral court ruled in August 2013 that the candidatures of Rajoelina, Ravalomanana and Ratsiraka were invalid and not be permitted to run in the 2013 election. Andry Rajoelina then announced his endorsement of presidential candidate Hery Rajaonarimampianina, who won the presidential election race. Andry Rajoelina officially stepped down on 25 January 2014.

Rajaonarimampianina set up the MAPAR committee to organize the selection of his cabinet, a process that extended over several months. During this time, Rajoelina sought to be nominated for the position of Prime Minister of Madagascar but Rajaonarimampianina picked Roger Kolo, with the support of the majority in the parliament. On 18 April, a cabinet was announced that comprised 31 members with varied political affiliations.

Policies and governance 

Upon taking office, Rajoelina dissolved the Senate and Parliament to transfer their powers to his cabinet, the officials of the HAT, and the newly established Council for social and economic strengthening, through which his policies were issued as decrees. Legislative authority rested in practice with Rajoelina and his cabinet, composed of his closest advisers. A military committee established in April increased HAT control over security and defense policy. The following month, after the suspension of the country's 22 regional governors, the Transitional government strengthened its influence over local government by naming replacements. The National Inquiry Commission (CNME) was established shortly thereafter to strengthen HAT effectiveness in addressing judicial and legal matters.

One of Andry Rajoelina's first measures as President was to cancel Ravalomanana's unpopular deal with Daewoo Logistics. On 2 June 2009, Ravalomanana was fined 70 million US dollars (42 million British pounds) and sentenced to four years in prison for alleged abuse of office which, according to HAT Justice Minister Christine Razanamahasoa, included the December 2008 purchase of a second presidential jet ("Air Force II") worth $60 million. Rajoelina also pursued legal action against Ravalomanana's company Tiko to reclaim 35 million US dollars in back taxes. Additionally, on 28 August 2010, the HAT sentenced Ravalomanana in absentia to hard labor for life and issued an arrest warrant for his role in the protests and ensuing deaths. He also rejected Ravalomanana's medium term development strategy, termed the Madagascar Action Plan, and abandoned education reforms initiated by his predecessor that adopted Malagasy and English as languages of instruction, instead returning to the traditional use of French. Later in 2012, he sold the controversial Boeing 747 bought by his predecessor with public funds.

Sanctions and suspension of donor aid amounted to 50% of the national budget and 70% of public investments, which obstructed the government's management of state affairs. Rajoelina occasionally organized events to distribute basic items to the population, including medicines, clothing, house maintenance materials and school supplies. His administration spent billions of ariary to subsidize basic needs like electricity, petrol, and food staples. In 2010, two years after Rajoelina launched the project as mayor of Antananarivo, the HAT completed the reconstruction of the Hotel de Ville (town hall) of Antananarivo which had been destroyed by arson during the rotaka political protests of 1972. During this ceremony, Andry Rajoelina announced that 11 December was a new holiday in the Malagasy calendar, and the fourth Constitution of the country was enacted.

Through the trano mora ("affordable house") initiative, the HAT built several subsidized housing developments intended for young middle class couples. Numerous other construction projects were planned or completed, including the restoration of historic staircases in Antananarivo built in the 19th century during the reign of Queen Ranavalona I; the repaving of the heavily traveled road between Toamasina and Foulpointe; the construction of a 15,000-capacity municipal stadium and new town hall in Toamasina; and the construction of a hospital built to international standards in Toamasina.

2018 presidential campaign 

In early August 2018, Andry Rajoelina was the first to register his candidacy for the 2018 presidential elections. He had previously introduced the Initiative for the Emergence of Madagascar (IEM) that define the lines of his campaign program. One campaign promise is to close the Senate to save money and build universities instead. He also aims to increase access to electricity, to work towards agricultural self-sufficiency, and to increase security.

The campaign started in October 2018, with Andry Rajoelina facing his historical opponents Ravalomanana and Rajaonarimampianina, the favorites in a campaign of 46 candidates. In the first round of the elections on 7 November, he took the lead with 39.19% (1,949,851) of the votes (Ravalomana 35.29% or 1,755,855 votes). A televised debate between the two final candidates was aired live on 10 December.

Rajoelina won the election with 55.66 % of the votes and was inaugurated on 19 January 2019.

President of Madagascar (2019–present)

COVID-19 pandemic

In April and May 2020, President Rajoelina gained media attention when he launched an untested COVID-19 "cure" dubbed "Covid-Organics". The herbal tea was developed by the Madagascar Institute of Applied Research (MIAR) using artemisia and other locally-sourced herbs. The military distributed batches of "Covid-Organics" to the public. Drinking the herbal tea was made obligatory in school. Several African countries including Tanzania, Liberia, Equatorial Guinea, and Guinea-Bissau have purchased the herbal tea. Matshidiso Moeti of the Africa regional office of the World Health Organization (WHO) said there was no available proof for the effectiveness of this cure. It had not undergone proper clinical trials and no peer-reviewed data existed. The National Academy of Medicine of Madagascar (ANAMEM) was also skeptical. A WHO advert on Google said: "Africans deserve to use medicines tested to the same standards as people in the rest of the world". The African Union has sought to test the technical efficiency of the herbal tea.

On 4 April, Arphine Helisoa (the pseudonym of Arphine Rahelisoa), a publishing director and journalist at the Ny Valosoa newspaper, was placed in custody awaiting trial charged with spreading fake news after she was accused of criticizing the president's handling of the pandemic and of "incitement of hatred" towards President Rajoelina. She was released after a month.

Environment
Rajoelina has blamed climate change for the food insecurity in parts of his country and has called on powerful nations to fight it.

During the COP26 meeting in Glasgow, Rajoelina, linked the risks of deforestation and biodiversity in Madagascar, and vowed to protect the forests of Madagascar, while also announcing the use of bioethanol and gas-based stoves in the country to fight the effects of climate change. Rajoelina also pledged more financial aid to protect the aforementioned biodiversity in Madagascar; which represents the world's 5%.

2021–2022 Madagascar famine

In June 2021, a severe drought caused hundreds of thousands of people, with some estimations claiming more than one million people, to suffer from food insecurity in the south of the country. Rajoelina jointly announced a plan to combat hunger along with US ambassador to the country Michael Pelletier. Among other measures, Rajoelina ordered the distribution of butane gas stoves to replace charcoal as an alternative for people in the poorest areas of the country. The measure reached a total of 15,000 households.

Rajoelina has promised to empower women during the famine while stating that the current food crisis in Madagascar is a consequence of a climate crisis which Malagasy people are suffering and in which "they did not participate". Rajoelina asked for a "radical and lasting change" during an International Development Association summit in Ivory Coast.

2021 assassination plot
On 22 July 2021, police announced they had arrested six people, including foreign nationals, after months of investigation into a plot to kill Rajoelina. The attorney general filed charges against them on different charges. The next day, the attorney general announced that at least one French citizen was among those arrested, and said that he was a former member of the French Armed Forces. France responded by saying that they were working with consular aid in Madagascar.

Disasters 
As president, he suffered two related disasters in December 2021; a large shipwreck and a helicopter crash in which his police minister Serge Gellé was one of the people on board.

Awards 

 2000: Entrepreneur of the Year by the magazine Écho Australe which named then-mayor of Antananarivo Marc Ravalomanana their Entrepreneur of the Year in 1999, bestowed the same honor on Rajoelina in 2000.
 2003: Best young entrepreneur in Madagascar by French bank BNI Crédit Lyonnais

References

External links
 Official website

|-

|-

1974 births
Living people
Malagasy businesspeople
Malagasy Roman Catholics
Mayors of Antananarivo
Merina people
Presidents of Madagascar
Young Malagasies Determined politicians
People from Antsirabe
21st-century Malagasy politicians